Abu Ali Hasan ibn Ali Tusi (April 10, 1018 – October 14, 1092), better known by his honorific title of Nizam al-Mulk was a Persian scholar, jurist, political philosopher and Vizier of the Seljuk Empire. Rising from a lowly position within the empire, he effectively became the de facto ruler of the empire for 20 years after the assassination of Sultan Alp Arslan in 1072, serving as the archetypal "good vizier". Viewed by many historians as "the most important statesman in Islamic history", the policies implemented by Nizam al-Mulk would go on to remain as the basic foundation for administrative state structures in the Muslim world up until the 20th Century.

One of his most important legacies was the founding of the madrasa system in cities across the Seljuk Empire which were called the Nizamiyyas after him. This was seen to be as the first government sponsored education system in history and as the inspiration behind the university system in Western Europe. He also wrote the Book of Government, a political treatise that uses historical examples to discuss justice, effective rule, and the role of government in Islamic society, which would go on to inspire the works of Ibn Khaldun and became the prototype for Machiavellian thought throughout Europe.

Early life and service to the Ghaznavids
Abu Ali Hasan was born on 10 April 1018, in a small village named Radkan, near Tus, in Iran, to a dehqan family. Growing up he studied Shafi fiqh and the Ashari school of theology. His father Ali ibn Ishak served as a financial officer to the Ghaznavids. However, when the Seljuk Turks defeated the Ghaznavids at the Battle of Dandanaqan in 1040, and conquered Khorasan, Abu Ali Hasan's father fled to Ghazni. Hasan followed his father to Ghazni, and it is there where he first assumed a government office. He remained in Ghazni for three or four years, when he left the Ghaznavid court and entered service with the Seljuks.

Service to the Seljuks

Reign of Tughril and Alp Arslan
Around the year of 1043, Abu Ali Hasan stopped serving the Ghaznavids and entered the service of the Seljuk Turks. He later became chief administrator of the entire Khorasan province by 1059. When Tughril died childless in the city of Ray, he was succeeded by his nephew Suleiman which was contested by Alp Arslan, both of them sons of Tughril's brother Chaghri. His cousin Kutalmish who had both been a vital part of his campaigns and later a supporter of Yinal's rebellion also put forth a claim. Alp Arslan, with the aid of Abu Ali Hasan, defeated Kutalmish and succeeded him on April 27, 1064.

After Alp Arslan had consolidated his power in the Sejluk realm, he appointed Abu Ali Hasan as his vizier who would remain in that position throughout the reigns of Alp Arslan (1063–1072) and Malik-Shah I (1072–1092). Abu Ali Hasan was also given the title of "Nizam al-Mulk" ("Order of the Realm").

Alp Arslan's strength lays in the military realm. Domestic affairs were handled by Nizam al-Mulk, who also founded the administrative organization that characterized and strengthened the sultanate during the reigns of Alp Arslan and his son, Malik Shah I. Military iqtā’ (fiefs), governed by Seljuk princes, were established to provide support for the soldiery and to accommodate the nomadic Turks to the established Anatolian agricultural scene. This type of military fiefdom enabled the nomadic Turks to draw on the resources of the sedentary Iranians, and other established cultures within the Seljuk realm, and allowed Alp Arslan to field a huge standing army without depending on tribute from conquest to pay his soldiers. He not only had enough food from his subjects to maintain his military, but the taxes collected from traders and merchants added to his coffers sufficiently to fund his continuous wars.

Nizam accompanied Alp Arslan in all his campaigns and journeys, except a few. In February/March 1064 Alp Arslan, along with his son Malik-Shah I and Nizam al-Mulk, campaigned in Byzantine Armenia, where they managed to capture Ani. Several minor rulers then acknowledged Seljuk authority, while Alp Arslan and Nizam continued to penetrate deeper into the Caucasus, reaching Georgia. The Georgian ruler Bagrat IV, managed to make peace with Alp Arslan by giving his niece to him in marriage.

Nizam also made some expeditions on his own and conquered the citadel of Estakhr from the Shabankara chieftain Fadluya in 1067, and made another expedition in Fars. These successful conquests are said to have greatly increased his reputation. On August 26 of 1071, the decisive Battle of Manzikert was fought, which Nizam al-Mulk had missed because he had been sent to Persia with a convoy of materials.

Reign of Malik Shah I

Following Alp Arslan's assassination in 1072, Malik-Shah I was challenged in battle by his uncle, Kavurt. In January 1074, their armies met near Hamadan. Kavurt's troops consisted of the traditional Turkmen elements from Alp Arslan's army, while Malik's consisted of ghulams and contingents of Kurdish and Arab troops. Due to Turkmen defections to Malik's army, Kavurt was defeated and, despite Malik's consideration for mercy, later poisoned, presumably on the orders of Nizam al-Mulk.

Under Nizam's excellent guidance the Seljuk armies contained the Ghaznavids in Khorasan, rolled back the Fatimids in Syria, defeated other Seljuk pretenders to the throne, invaded Georgia and reduced it to a tributary state, compelled the submission of regional governors, and kept the Abbasid Caliphs in a position of impotence.

Nizam al-Mulk left a great mark on organization of the Seljuk governmental bodies and hence the title Nizam al-Mulk which translates as "Order of the Realm." He bridged political gaps among the Abbasids, the Seljuks, and their various rivals such as the Fatimids. The Seljuk military was heavily mixed of different ethnicity, including Turks, Armenians, Greeks, Arabs, and Slavs. Nizam, however, favored Iranian soldiers, such as the Dailamites, Khorasanis, and the Shabankara. He also favored non-Iranian soldiers such as the Georgians.

Nizam al-Mulk's many political objectives included:

 Creating an employment opportunity for the Turkmens, who had immigrated to the Iranian plateau during the Seljuk successes in Persia, the nomadic way of life of the Turkmens represented a significant threat to the political and economic stability of the country.
 Demonstrating the power of the Sultan (i.e. the strength and mobility of his forces, but also his grace towards docile rebels).
 Maintaining local Sunni and Shiite rulers as vassals of the Sultan and the increased use of relatives of the Sultan as provincial governors.
 Preventing dissents over the succession of Malik-Shah I.
 Maintaining good relations with the Abbasid Caliphate.

In 1081/1082, Ibn Bahmanyar, one of the many enemies of Nizam, tried to poison him, but failed and was blinded by Nizam. After the blinding of Ibn Bahmanyar, the enemies of Nizam made false stories about him and his son. This greatly angered Nizam's son Jamal al-Mulk, who tore out the tongue of Ja'farak, one of the perpetrators of the false stories. Malik Shah had no power to intervene in the event, but instead had Jamal poisoned.

In 1091, a group of Qarmatians sacked Basra, while the Isma'ilis under the leadership of Hassan-i Sabbah seized the fortress of Alamut. Moreover, the succession to the sultanate was complicated by the death of two of Malik-Shah's eldest sons: Dawud (died 1082) and Ahmad (died 1088), whom both were sons of the Kara-Khanid Princess Terken Khatun.  She also had a son named Mahmud (born 1087) whom she wanted to succeed his father, while Nizam and most of the Seljuk army was in favor of Barkiyaruq, the oldest of all Malik-Shah's living sons and born to a Seljuk princess. Terken Khatun then allied with Taj al-Mulk Abu'l Ghana'im to try to remove Nizam from his post. Taj even accused Nizam of corruption before the sultan. Malik Shah I, however, did not dare to dismiss Nizam. Nizam later besieged Alamut, but was forced to withdraw.

In 1092, Nizam, just before his death, knowing that his enemies were planning plots against him, made a famous speech at the court:

Works

Aside from his extraordinary influence as vizier with full authority, he is also well known for systematically founding a number of schools of higher education in several cities like Baghdad, Isfahan, Amol, Nishapur, Mosul, Basra, and Herat, the famous Nizamiyyah schools, which were named after him. In many aspects, these schools turned out to be the predecessors and models of universities that were established in Europe.

Nizam al-Mulk is also widely known for his voluminous treatise on kingship titled Siyasatnama (Book of Government) which was written after Malik Shah had requested that his ministers produce books on government, administration and the troubles facing the nation. However, the treatise made by Nizam was the only one to receive approval and was consequently accepted as forming "the law of the constitution of the nation". The treatise uses historical examples to discuss justice, effective rule, and the role of government in Islamic society, and has been compared to Machiavelli's The Prince. The work also discusses various aspects of state surveillance and spying, advising rulers to establish an extensive espionage network.

He also wrote a book titled Dastur al-Wuzarā, written for his son Abulfath Fakhr al-Malik, which is not dissimilar to the famous book of Qabus nama.

Death

Nizam al-Mulk was assassinated en route from Isfahan to Baghdad on 10 Ramadan 485 A.H. (14 October 1092) The mainstream literature says he was stabbed by the dagger of a member of the Assassins, sent by the notorious Hassan-i Sabbah near Nahavand, as he was being carried on his litter. The killer approached him disguised as a Sufi.

This account is particularly interesting in light of a possibly apocryphal story that first appeared in English in the introduction to Edward Fitzgerald's translation of the Rubaiyat of Omar Khayyam. In this story a pact is formed between a young Nizam al-Mulk (at that time known as Abdul Khassem) and his two friends, Omar Khayyam and Hassan-i-Sabbah. Their agreement stated that if one should rise to prominence, that they would help the other two to do likewise. Nizam al-Mulk was the first to do this when he was appointed vizier to the sultan Alp Arslan. To fulfill the pact he offered both friends positions of rank within the court. Omar refused the offer, asking instead to be given the means to continue his studies indefinitely. This Nizam did, as well as building him an observatory. Although Hassan, unlike Omar, decided to accept the appointment offered to him, he was forced to flee after plotting to depose Nizam as vizier. Subsequently, Hassan came upon and conquered the fortress of Alamut, from where he established the Assassins.  According to Bernard Lewis, this tale is unlikely to be true because Hassan-i Sabbah died in 1124, and Omar Khayyam in 1123 at the earliest. Since Nizam al-Mulk was born in 1020 at the latest, the three were not of similar ages and were probably not students together.

Legacy

Nizam al-Mulk was an excellent and clever vizier, he represented the majesty, splendor and hospitality of the Barmakids, historians and poets describe him as a great organizer and an ideal soldier and scholar. Because of his talents, it was possible for the Seljuk Turks to establish a powerful empire in their new home. Nizam was not only the leader of the Persian-dominated bureaucratic (divan), but was also an atabeg who served in the royal court (dadgar) and played an important role between the politically and culturally different Iranians and Turks. He was also responsible for establishing distinctly Persian forms of government and administration which would last for centuries. Because of his excellent tutorship and close friendship with Malik-Shah, he was usually called "father" by him. He was even greatly respected by his ghulams, who, after the death of Nizam, took revenge on several of his rivals, such as Taj al-Mulk Abu'l Ghana'im.

Even after his death his family continued to play an important role in the Seljuk Empire. He was married to a niece or daughter of Bagrat IV of Georgia, who had previously been married or betrothed to Alp Arslan.  All of his twelve sons held important offices in the Seljuk Empire, the most prominent of his sons were: Ahmad ibn Nizam al-Mulk, served as the vizier of the Seljuk Sultan Muhammad I Tapar  and the Abbasid caliph al-Mustarshid;  Shams al-Mulk Uthman was the governor of Merv and head of the Seljuk military; Fakhr al-Mulk served as the vizier of Barkiyaruq and Muhammad I Tapar; Jamal al-Mulk (who died before Nizam) served as the governor of Balkh; Izz al-Mulk and Mu'ayyid al-Mulk served as viziers of Barkiyaruq; Imad al-Mulk Abu'l-Kasim served as the vizier of the Seljuk governor of Balkh.

References

Sources
 Aladashvili Besik., Fearless: A Fascinating Story of Secret Medieval Spies, 2017.

External links

 The story behind the assassination
 Gokmen Durmus — Upenn Master's Thesis on Turkish Wisdom
 More Photos, Tishineh

1018 births
1092 deaths
11th-century Iranian scientists
11th-century Iranian philosophers
People from Tus, Iran
Assassinated Iranian politicians
Iranian political philosophers
Viziers of the Seljuk Empire
Scholars from the Seljuk Empire
Dehqans
Ghaznavid officials
Atabegs
Critics of Shia Islam
Iranian ethicists
People of the Nizari–Seljuk wars
Victims of the Order of Assassins